Acericecis is a genus of gall midges in the family Cecidomyiidae. There are at least three described species in Acericecis.

Species
These three species belong to the genus Acericecis:
 Acericecis ocellaris (Osten Sacken, 1862) (ocellate gall midge)
 Acericecis vitrina (Kieffer, 1909)
 † Cecidomyia chaneyi (Cockerell, 1927)

References

Further reading

 
 
 
 
 

Cecidomyiinae
Articles created by Qbugbot
Nematocera genera